Potato Patches, also known as Patches Plain or, colloquially, The Patches, is an agricultural area and uninhabited rural settlement in Tristan da Cunha, in Saint Helena, Ascension and Tristan da Cunha, an overseas territory of the United Kingdom, in the South Atlantic Ocean.

History

The plain has been used for agricultural purposes since the 1860s.

Geography

Potato Patches lies 3.7 km southwest of Edinburgh of the Seven Seas and represents the largest plain of Tristan da Cunha island. For this reason the area is used by the local population as an agricultural area, the largest on the island. It is composed of various cultivated plots, hence the name, and some scattered rural farmhouses, from the coast to the M1 road.

The field is composed of irregularly arranged beds. In the beds, which are surrounded by walls to protect them from the weather, mainly potatoes and other vegetables have been planted for self-sufficiency for about 160 years. Every family on the island has their own fields that they cultivate themselves.

The plain spans from Spring Gulch to Big Sandy Gulch, next to the Boatharbour Bay and the hill of Hillpiece, on the slopes of Queen Mary's Peak (2,062 m), a volcano and the summit of the island. It is crossed by Walsh Gulch, who separates the southern plots from the other ones. To the south of Spring Gulch is located Runaway Beach, home of the island's rock pools.

Transport
There is one road, the M1, which connects the Patches with Edinburgh of the Seven Seas, and is used by the few private cars on the island. A bus service called "Potato Patches Flier" (using a 24-seat Isuzu mini school bus from South Africa) is available to pensioners in town to travel to places around the island.

See also
Tristan hotspot
Sandy Point, Tristan da Cunha
List of towns in Saint Helena, Ascension and Tristan da Cunha

References

External links

 Potato Patches (Tristan's official website)
 Tristan da Cunha Farming (Tristan's official website)

Tristan da Cunha
Populated places in Saint Helena, Ascension and Tristan da Cunha